Microcephalops is a genus of flies belonging to the family Pipunculidae.

Species
Microcephalops adunatus (Hardy, 1972)
Microcephalops angustifacies (Hardy, 1949)
Microcephalops anthracias (Perkins, 1905)
Microcephalops banksi (Aczél, 1940)
Microcephalops borneensis (Hardy, 1972)
Microcephalops brevicornis (Loew, 1858)
Microcephalops conspectus (Hardy, 1949)
Microcephalops damasi (Hardy, 1950)
Microcephalops dolosus (Hardy, 1972)
Microcephalops exsertus (Hardy, 1966)
Microcephalops fimbriatus (Hardy, 1972)
Microcephalops floridae De Meyer, 1990
Microcephalops griseus De Meyer, 1990
Microcephalops homoeophanes (Perkins, 1905)
Microcephalops inermus (Hardy, 1954)
Microcephalops kurseongiensis (Kapoor, Grewal & Sharma, 1987)
Microcephalops latifrons (Hardy, 1948)
Microcephalops microdes (Perkins, 1905)
Microcephalops minisculus De Meyer, 1996
Microcephalops montanus De Meyer, 1996
Microcephalops mutuus (Hardy, 1968)
Microcephalops opacus (Fallén, 1816)
Microcephalops parafloridae De Meyer, 1990
Microcephalops ravilateralis (Hardy, 1965)
Microcephalops rufopictus (Hardy, 1962)
Microcephalops spenceri (Hardy, 1972)
Microcephalops stenopsis (Hardy, 1960)
Microcephalops subaeneus (Brunetti, 1923)
Microcephalops subdolosus (Kapoor, Grewal & Sharma, 1987)
Microcephalops transversalis (Rafael, 1991)
Microcephalops williamsi (Hardy, 1954)

References

Pipunculidae
Brachycera genera
Diptera of Europe
Diptera of Asia
Diptera of South America
Diptera of North America
Diptera of Africa
Diptera of Australasia